The Dongjiakou Port railway is a freight-only railway line in Shandong, China.

History
The line was approved on 16 February 2011. It opened on 25 December 2018.

Route
At its northern terminus, there is a grade-separated junction allowing trains to continue in either direction on the Qingdao–Yancheng railway. The junction is located just to the north of Dongjiakou railway station.

References

Railway lines in China
Railway lines opened in 2018